Risco de los Claveles, (in English, Carnation Crag), is the second highest peak in the Sierra de Guadarrama (Sistema Central, Spain). It is 2366 meters high (7835 ft.), and is located in the northwest of Peñalara Natural Park, 700 meters north from Peñalara peak. Risco de los Claveles is in the limit between the provinces of Segovia and Madrid.

Description 

Risco de los Claveles is a sharp mount. The sides are covered in vegetation. Under 2000 meters, there is abundant life:pine, eagles, insects and vultures. Above that, there are some bushes and grass.

Gallery

See also 
 Sierra de Guadarrama
 Peñalara
 Mountains of Spain

Two-thousanders of Spain
Sierra de Guadarrama